Third Avenue Elevated refers to the following elevated railways:

 The defunct IRT Third Avenue Line in Manhattan and the Bronx, New York City
 The defunct BMT Third Avenue Line in Brooklyn, New York City